Underground Aces is a 1981 film directed by Robert Butler  ,starring Dirk Benedict and Melanie Griffith. The plot revolves around a group of misfits who park cars in a hotel's underground parking lot, and get in plenty of trouble along the way.

Cast

Main
 Dirk Benedict as Pete Huffman
 Melanie Griffith as Lucy
 Rick Podell as Joe
 Randy Brooks as Ollie
 T. K. Carter as Dee Jay
 Kario Salem as Sheik
 Don Hawthorne as Rick

Supporting
 Joshua Daniel as Wally
 Ralph Seymour as Zig
 Michael Winslow as Nate
 Robert Hegyes as Tico
 Fawne Harriman as Mitzi
 Audrey Landers as Annie Wenders
 Mimi Maynard as Madeline
 Jerry Orbach as Herbert Penlittle
 Frank Gorshin as Fred Kruger
 Sid Haig as Faoud
 William Mims 
 Phil Adams as Chef
 Marlena Amey as Vamp
 Jerry Anderson as Mr. Naughton
 Selma Archerd as Sales Lady
 James Bacon as Businessman #2
 Kathleen Bracken as Lily
 Barbara Burroughs as Club Lady
 Twink Caplan as Marsha
 Jade Clark as Girl with Ripped Dress
 Steve Daron as Night Ace
 Bob Drew as Murphy
 Lynda Farrell as Cowgirl
 Andrea Frierson as Lena
 Gina Gallego as Juanita
 Sonny Gibson as Pro Bowler #2
 Bob Harders as Russell
 Sosimo Hernandez as Uncle Fausto
 Ernie Hudson as African General
 Nancy Jeris as Mrs. Wenders
 Nicky Katt as Son
 Kellie Khristiansen as Hooker
 Jack Krupnick as Pro Bowler #1
 Elli Maclure as Waitress (Credited as Ellie Maclure)
 Jock McNeil as Businessman #1
 Biff Manard as Pimp
 Marsha Meyers as Mother
 Sarah Miller as Club Lady
 Jed Mills as Father
 Jonathan Moore as Cook
 Yvonne Regalado as Rita
 Bill Smillie as Fire Chief
 Rebecca Stanley as Sally

References

External links

1981 films
Films directed by Robert Butler
1980s English-language films